Bohdan Mykolayovych Shmyhelskyi (born 21 December 1993) is a Ukrainian professional footballer who plays as a right winger for Ukrainian club Skoruk Tomakivka.

References

External links
 
 

1993 births
Living people
Ukrainian footballers
Association football forwards
FC Nikopol players
FC VPK-Ahro Shevchenkivka players
FC Alians Lypova Dolyna players
FC Skoruk Tomakivka players
Ukrainian First League players
Ukrainian Second League players
Ukrainian Amateur Football Championship players